Rolf Becker (born 31 March 1935) is a German television actor and political activist. By his first wife, actress Monika Hansen, he is the father of actor Ben Becker, and actress and singer Meret Becker.

Selected filmography
 Widower with Five Daughters (1957)
  The Murderer with the Silk Scarf (1966)
 A Handful of Heroes (1967)
 Cardillac (1969)
 I'm an Elephant, Madame (1969)
 Ich liebe dich, ich töte dich (1971)
  (1978, TV miniseries)
 Derrick - Season 6, Episode 07: "Lena" (1979)
 Derrick - Season 7, Episode 08: "Auf einem Gutshof" (1980)
 Derrick - Season 8, Episode 11: "Die Stunde der Mörder" (1981)
 Blood and Honor: Youth Under Hitler (1982, TV miniseries) (lead role)
 Vom Webstuhl zur Weltmacht (1983, TV series)
  (1984, TV miniseries)
 Gloomy Sunday (1999)
  (2001)
 NimmerMeer (2006)
 Mr. Kaplan (2014)

External links
 
 Herald Management Taufkirchen 

1935 births
Living people
German male television actors
German male film actors
Actors from Leipzig